Come to the Blue Adriatic is a 1966 Spanish-West German comedy film directed by Lothar Gündisch and starring Dietmar Schönherr,  Hannelore Auer and Gustavo Rojo. In Spain it was known as The Red Bikini.

Although set on the Adriatic Sea, it was actually shot on the Costa del Sol around Málaga.

Cast
 Dietmar Schönherr as Walter Thomas
 Hannelore Auer as Ingrid
 Gustavo Rojo as Sr. Hernández
 Maria Brockerhoff as Renate
 Margitta Scherr as Tina
 Thomas Alder as Heribert Kindlein
 Ruth Stephan as Frl. Habicht
 Fritz Benscher as Hugo Becker
 Uschi Mumoth as Lilo
 Hannelore Hartline as Helen
 Sadie Mertzger as Katja
 Johanna König as Frl. Schnebeli
 Manfred Schnelldorfer as Joachim
 Vivi Bach as Sängerin
 Roy Etzel as Trompeter

References

Bibliography 
 Francesc Llinàs. Directores de fotografía del cine español. Filmoteca Española, 1989.

External links 
 

1966 films
1966 comedy films
German comedy films
West German films
1960s German-language films
Spanish comedy films
Films shot in Spain
1960s German films